Carurú is a town and municipality located in the department of Vaupés, Colombia. The town is on the north bank of the Vaupés River in the Amazon natural region of the country.

The town is served by the Carurú Airport and there are no road connections to the rest of the country, the only waterway is the Vaupés River.

Municipalities of Vaupés Department
1993 establishments in Colombia